Bar Keepers Friend is an American brand of mass-produced cleaning agents. The original canned scouring powder product has been manufactured and sold since 1882. It was invented by a chemist in Indianapolis, Indiana, where it continues to be manufactured by SerVaas Laboratories. The canned product's primary active ingredient is oxalic acid.  Bar Keepers Friend has various cleaning uses.

Overview 
Bar Keepers Friend was originally manufactured in 1882 as a cleaning agent in powdered form. This formulation is still manufactured today. It was invented by chemist George William Hoffman in Indianapolis, Indiana. The product was originally sold to bars in Indianapolis and Hoffman asserted in a patent application that the name had been used since January, 1887. The formula contains oxalic acid as a primary ingredient.

The Bar Keepers Friend logo represents the swinging doors of a saloon. According to the president of SerVaas Laboratories, Paul SerVaas, although some people complained during Prohibition, "the name was never changed. It's been Bar Keepers Friend since 1882".

In the 1950s the product became the base of a line of cleaning products made by Indianapolis-based SerVaas Laboratories, which started producing and carrying products under the Bar Keepers Friend brand name. Additional products manufactured and marketed under the Bar Keepers Friend brand name include liquid, cream and spray cleaners. SerVaas Laboratories had 40 employees in May 2011 and 54 in April 2016.

Production
Bar Keepers Friend products are mass-produced in a manufacturing environment that has significant automation in the process. The powdered and canned (original) product is formulated in separate two-ton batches during the production process. In September 2016, the canned powdered product was manufactured at a rate of approximately 60,000 cans per day, which are packaged in 12, 15 and 21 ounce cans.

Active ingredients
According to the 2015 material safety data sheet, the ingredients are feldspar, linear sodium dodecyl benzene sulfonate (DDBSA) and oxalic acid. Prolonged use and extended skin contact may cause irritation, peeling and contact dermatitis, which is avoided by wearing gloves. The product can also be an eye irritant.

Performance and uses
In 1994, Consumer Reports found Bar Keepers Friend to perform on a par with Mr. Clean for removing baked-on soil, tea stains and other pot stains, and that it was better at removing rust. While recommending Bar Keepers Friend for a variety of household cleaning uses, author Heather Solos warned that it should not be used to clean silverware, pewter or real marble.

The product serves to make stainless steel resistant to oxidation via the process of passivation and can remove rust on stainless steel. The product can also remove small scratches from stainless steel, silver and plates.

Uses of Bar Keepers Friend that are not noted on its label include removing hard water stains from glass and windows and removing the brown or yellow stains caused by sunscreen containing avobenzone. The product can also clean teak wood and serves to bleach it.

See also
 List of cleaning products

References

Further reading

External links
 
 

1882 introductions
Cleaning product brands